Slasher is an anthology slasher horror television series created by Aaron Martin. It premiered on Chiller on March 4, 2016, and on Super Channel on April 1, 2016. The licensing rights for the second season were acquired by Netflix in January 2017. The second season was released on October 17, 2017. On August 8, 2018, the series was renewed for a third season, which premiered on May 23, 2019. An eight-episode fourth season was ordered for Shudder, premiering on August 12, 2021. On February 10, 2022, the series was renewed for a fifth season.

Premise
Each season is centered on a masked killer with an unknown motive for killing their victims. The first season, retroactively subtitled The Executioner, was co-produced by Chiller and Super Channel, and centered on a mysterious figure billed as the Executioner who terrorizes the fictional town of Waterbury, Canada. The second season, subtitled Guilty Party, follows a group of former summer camp counselors who return to an isolated campground in order to retrieve the body of a murder they committed, before being targeted, one by one, by an unknown killer. The third season, Solstice, is centered on a group of neighbors who are targeted during the summer solstice period due to their complicity in not saving a murder victim who was killed one year earlier in front of their apartment complex. The fourth season, Flesh & Blood focuses on the wealthy yet dysfunctional Galloway family but after the sudden death of the family's patriarch the remaining family members are forced to compete in a series of twisted games in order to win the family's entire fortune all the while being hunted by a masked killer.

Seasons

The Executioner (2016)
Sarah Bennett and her husband Dylan move back to the town of her birth, fictitious Waterbury, Canada, into her childhood home, where both of her parents were murdered on the Halloween of 1988. Her mother was pregnant with Sarah at the time of the killing before the police arrests the killer who was holding the newborn baby. Sarah's return to Waterbury is greeted with the start of a series of copycat murders, all appearing to be at the hands of "The Executioner."

Guilty Party (2017)
In the dead of winter, a group of former summer camp counselors return to the resort where they participated in the murder of Talvinder Gill, then hid her body. The body has vanished from its secret hiding spot. They are then trapped in the resort and, one by one, killed by a murderer in a parka.

Solstice (2019)
Kit Jennings, a sex and drug addict, is murdered by someone using a "Druid" costume in front of an apartment complex during the summer solstice and the neighbors don't help him. Exactly one year later, a person using the same costume emerges and starts murdering every person who carries any kind of complicity in Jennings' murder.

Flesh & Blood (2021)
Slasher: Flesh & Blood follows a wealthy but dysfunctional family gathering for a reunion on a secluded island. Their old wounds and competitive rivalries flare up when the family realizes a masked killer is on the island, intent on cruelly picking them off one by one.

Ripper (2023)
Slasher: Ripper will head back in time to the late 19th century – where there’s a killer stalking the streets, but instead of targeting the poor and downtrodden like Jack the Ripper, The Widow is meting out justice against the rich and powerful. The only person standing in the way of this killer is the newly promoted detective, Kenneth Rijkers, whose ironclad belief in justice may wind up being yet another victim.

Cast and characters

Recurring cast members

The Executioner

Main
 Katie McGrath as Sarah Bennett, an art gallery owner who recently moved in to the house her parents were murdered in, in Waterbury, her place of birth.
 Steve Byers as Cam Henry, a member of Waterbury's police force.
 Brandon Jay McLaren as Dylan Bennett, Sarah's husband and editor-in-chief of the local newspaper, the Waterbury Bulletin.
 Patrick Garrow as Tom Winston, the original Executioner who murdered Sarah's parents in 1988 and who advises Sarah on the new Executioner's murders in the present day.
 Christopher Jacot as Robin Turner, who, after the death of his husband, Justin, must deal with the business mess he left behind.
 Dean McDermott as Iain Vaughn, Waterbury's police chief.
 Mary Walsh as Verna McBride, Sarah and Dylan's neighbor, who passed judgment almost immediately on the two.
 Enuka Okuma as Lisa Ann Follows, a former criminal justice lawyer, now a New York-based journalist and talk show host.
 Erin Karpluk as Heather Peterson. She is deeply haunted by and obsessed with her daughter Ariel's disappearance, which occurred 5 years earlier. Karpluk has equated Heather to the Log Lady, in that much like the Twin Peaks character, Heather appears to have a sixth sense about Waterbury's residents and their dark secrets.  
 Wendy Crewson as Brenda Merrit, Sarah's maternal grandmother, who returns to Waterbury to look after Sarah and Dylan.

Recurring and guest
 Mayko Nguyen as Alison Sutherland, the publisher of the Waterbury Bulletin and Dylan's boss.
 Rob Stewart as Alan Henry, Cam's father, a church pastor, and the survivor/witness of Sarah's parents' murder. He has made occasional visits to Tom Winston in prison to provide religious counsel. In a flashback of the night Sarah's parents were murdered, young Alan is portrayed by Jim Watson.
 Dylan Taylor as Bryan Ingram, Sarah's father.
 Mark Ghanimé as Justin Faysal, who with husband Robin purchased several properties in Waterbury, including the storefront location that serves as Sarah's art gallery.
 Jessica Sipos as June Henry, Cam's wife, who works as an EMT and shows jealousy over Cam's friendship with Sarah.
 Victoria Snow as Sonja Edwards, Brenda's former childhood friend and her intended victim in a prom night 1968 incident.
 Jefferson Brown as Trent McBride, Verna's nephew, June Henry's former EMT partner, and an enthusiastic hunter and taxidermist.
 Booth Savage as Ronald Edwards, the Mayor of Waterbury.
 Hannah Endicott-Douglas as Ariel Peterson, Heather's missing daughter.
 Aidan Wojtak as Jake Vaughn, Ariel's younger son.
 Sabrina Grdevich as Nancy Vaughn, Chief Vaughn's wife.
 Michael Vincent Dagostino as Benny Peterson, Heather's late husband and Ariel's father.
 Suzannah Hoffman as Marjorie Travers, a prostitute and drug addict.
 Alysa King as Rachel Ingram, Sarah's mother.
 Anthony Lemke as Dylan's lawyer.
 Shawn Ahmed as Sharma, an officer in Waterbury's police force.

Guilty Party

Main
 Lovell Adams-Gray as Peter Broome, a former counselor and Andi's ex-boyfriend. Five years ago, his affair with Talvinder resulted in his breakup with Andi.
 Christopher Jacot as Antoine, one of the commune leaders, masseur and yoga instructor. He is Renee's legal husband, though he is gay.
 Rebecca Liddiard as Andi Criss, a former camp counselor and Peter's ex-girlfriend. Five years ago, Peter had an affair with Talvinder, resulting in their breakup.
 Kaitlyn Leeb as Susan Lam, a former camp counselor, mother and wife. Five years ago, she despised Talvinder believing she was not genuine.
 Paula Brancati as Dawn Duguin, a former camp counselor. Five years ago, she and Talvinder were best friends until she stopped Dawn from having a relationship out of envy.
 Jim Watson as Noah Jenkins, a former camp counselor. Five years ago, Talvinder manipulated him into doing things for her by pretending to have a romantic interest in him.
 Joanne Vannicola as Renée, one of the commune's leaders alongside her legal husband Antoine, though she is a lesbian.
 Paulino Nunes as Mark Rankin, a commune member and former lawyer. He joined the resort after nearly being killed by the father of the victim's murderer he successfully defended.
 Leslie Hope as Judith Berry, a commune member, who self-harms whilst recovering from drug addiction.
 Madison Cheeatow as Keira, a commune member and former nurse, who joined the resort after accidentally killing a patient.
 Ty Olsson as Benny Ironside/Glenn Morgan, a commune member and former prisoner. He joined the resort after killing his former lover and assuming his identity.
 Sebastian Pigott as Owen "Wren" Turnbull, Judith's son and a former counselor. He had an unhealthy obsession with Talvinder.
 Melinda Shankar as Talvinder Gill, a new, manipulative camp counselor. Her murder five years ago drives the events of Guilty Party. She played on the other counselors' kindness.

Recurring and guest 
 Jefferson Brown as Gene, the outfitter and supply deliverer for the commune.
 Kyle Buchanan as Simon, Andi's current boyfriend. Her guilt about Talvinder's death causes tension in their relationship.
 Luke Humphrey as Glenn Morgan, a former drug dealer who was forced into a sexual relationship with Benny in prison. After expressing his hatred for him, he was murdered by Benny, who assumed his identity.
 Dean McDermott as Alan Haight, a man whose son died in a hit and run accident.
 Rebecca Amzallag as Stephanie, a coworker of Mark who he had an affair with.
 Simu Liu as Luke, Susan's kind and oblivious husband.
 Sophia Walker as Megan McAllister, a hiker who approaches the commune in search of shelter from an imminent snowstorm.
 Jon McLaren as Ryan, a former counselor. He and Dawn were mutually interested in each other romantically until Talvinder manipulated him into thinking Dawn's stepfather raped her.
 Kimberly-Sue Murray as Janice, Gene's girlfriend who comes looking for him at the commune.

Solstice

Main
Baraka Rahmani as Saadia Jalalzai, a student at the local high school, a Muslim, and Jen's best friend. She has a reputation for being good. She and her parents live in apartment 102.
Mercedes Morris as Jen Rijkers, a student at the local high school, Connor's sister, Amber's stepdaughter and Saadia's best friend.
Lisa Berry as Detective Roberta Hanson, the detective in charge of investigating the Druid murders.
Salvatore Antonio as Angel H. Lopez, a gay activist who has an affair with Joe. He lives in apartment 106.
Rosie Simon as Amy Chao, Xander's girlfriend, a professional gamer, who works beta testing video games. She is asexual. She and Xander live in apartment 216.
Dean McDermott as Dan F. Olenski, Cassidy's father, an alcoholic Neo-Nazi white supremacist. He and his daughter live in apartment 108.
Ilan Muallem as Joe Lickers, Violet's bisexual husband, who has an affair with Angel, but has a hard time choosing who he wants to be with.
Paula Brancati as Violet Lickers, Joe's wife, a vlogger who considers her blog to be journalism, and seems to care more about her blog than about her husband. She and her husband live in apartment 208.
Gabriel Darku as Connor Rijkers, the superintendent of the apartment building, Jen's brother and Amber's stepson, who has a crush on Saadia. He and his family live in apartment 202.
Erin Karpluk as Kaili Greenberg, a biology teacher at the local high school who is a hopeless romantic. She lives in apartment 112.
Jim Watson as Xander Lemmon, Amy's boyfriend, who runs the local coffee shop. He takes pride in his products, which are supposedly above average quality.
Joanne Vannicola as Amber Ciotti, the mentally ill, widowed stepmother of Connor and Jen. She became mentally ill after suffering a psychotic break after the suicide of her wife Justine.
Paulino Nunes as Frank G. Dixon, a violent, domineering family man, Kate's husband, Erica's father. He appears to have connections to the mob, and part of his business involves stealing cars. He and his family live in apartment 212, but at the time of Kit's murder, lived in apartment 201.

Recurring and guest 
Robert Cormier as Kit Jennings, a bisexual, hypersexual drug addict who was murdered a year before the events of the series. The others who lived in the apartment building were complicit in his murder. He lived in apartment 104.
Ishan Davé as Detective Pujit Singh, Detective Hanson's younger, less experienced partner, helping investigate the Druid murders.
Genevieve DeGraves as Cassidy E. Olenski, Dan Olenski's daughter, who has had sex with many people, including Kit Jennings.
Rebecca Amzallag as Beth, a math teacher at the local high school who is a friend of Kaili Greenberg.
Tiio Horn as Coroner Lucie Cooper, the coroner for the local police department, who performs autopsies on the victims of the Druid.
Jefferson Brown as Wyatt, Noelle Samuels' jealous ex-boyfriend.
Patrice Goodman as Justine Rijkers, Connor and Jen's mother, Amber's wife, who was shunned by the residents of the apartment building following a post she made implying Kit deserved to die.
Marie Ward as Kate Dixon, Frank's wife, who is abused by him.
Dalal Badr as Farishta Jalalzai, Saadia's mother.
Saad Siddiqui as Azlan Jalalzai, Saadia's father.
Romy Weltman as Erica Dixon, Frank and Kate's daughter.
Paniz Zade as Noelle Samuels, Kit Jennings' girlfriend, at the time of his murder.
Landon Norris as Charlie, a student at the local high school who takes pleasure in antagonizing Jen and Saadia, the latter to the point of sexual harassment.
Bill Moseley as Homeless Man, an aggressive man who antagonizes Angel and Xander.

Flesh & Blood

Main
 A.J. Simmons as Vincent Galloway, twin son of Florence who was abducted as a child. In flashbacks, young Vincent is portrayed by Judah Davidson.
 Alex Ozerov as Theo Galloway, twin son of Florence. In flashbacks, young Theo is portrayed by Joshua Reich.
 Chris Jacot as Seamus Galloway, the eldest son of Spencer, husband of Christy and adopted father of Aphra.
 Jeananne Goossen as Dr. Persephone Trinh, Spencer's physician.
 Maria del Mar as Annette Galloway, the first wife of Spencer and Seamus and Florence's mother.
 Paula Brancati as Christy Martin, the wife of Seamus and adopted mother of Aphra.
 Rachael Crawford as Grace Galloway, the second wife of Spencer and mother of his son Jayden.
 Sabrina Grdevich as Florence Galloway, the daughter of Spencer and mother of Theo, O’Keeffe and Vincent.
 Sydney Meyer as Livinia "Liv" Vogel, the daughter of Brigit. In flashbacks, young Liv is portrayed by Soreya Darra.
 Patrick Garrow as Ray Craft, an artist, O'Keefe's father.
 David Cronenberg as Spencer Galloway, the patriarch of the Galloway family who gathers his relatives on his secluded island so they can compete for his fortune.

Recurring and guest
 Breton Lalama as O’Keeffe Craft, the non-binary child of Florence.
 Corteon Moore as Jayden Galloway, the son of Spencer and his second wife Grace. In flashbacks, young Jayden is portrayed by Tau Sterling.
 Jefferson Brown as Merle, a sailor who escorts the Galloway family to the island.
 Nataliya Rodina as Aphra Galloway, the adopted daughter of Seamus and Christy who suffers from an eating disorder called pica.
 Patrice Goodman as Birgit Vogel, the housekeeper of the Galloway family and mother of Liv.

Ripper

Main
 Eric McCormack as Basil Garvey, a charismatic and ruthless tycoon.
 Gabriel Darku as Detective Kenneth Rijkers
 Lisa Berry as Dr. Melanda Israel
 Clare McConnell
 Thom Allison
 Daniel Kash
 Sadie Laflamme-Snow 
 Salvatore Antonio
 Sabrina Grdevich
 Jefferson Brown as Horatio
 Nataliya Rodina as Daisy
 Joanne Vannicola
 Paula Brancati as Connie
 Rob Stewart as Andrew May Sr.
 Steve Byers

Production

Development 
Slasher was created by Aaron Martin, who was inspired after his work on the first season of the medical series Saving Hope, specifically his writing of two episodes in which "people got chopped up." He wrote the first episode of the series as a spec script, aiming to offer it to prospective studios and show a writing style that was different from his previous work (e.g. Saving Hope, Degrassi: The Next Generation, and Being Erica). Though the script did not receive immediate interest, Shaftesbury Films optioned it in late 2014 with an eight-episode order and started pitching around to networks. Canadian premium network Super Channel ordered the project after showing interest in Slashers fixed-end format. The now-defunct American network Chiller, which specializes in the horror thriller genre, joined production shortly after; Slasher became Chiller's first and only foray into original scripted series content.

In May 2017, Shaftesbury Films confirmed that the series would not return to Super Channel or Chiller for a second season. However, streaming service Netflix acquired the rights to the second season. The second season was released via Netflix on October 17, 2017.

In August 2018, it was announced that production commenced for the third season of Slasher. On October 23, 2018, Adam MacDonald was announced as the third season's director. On April 24, 2019, it was announced that Aaron Martin had stepped down as the showrunner and Ian Carpenter would serve as the primary showrunner and one of executive producers of the third season.

On November 12, 2020, the series was moved to Shudder for a fourth season. On February 10, 2022, Shudder renewed the series for a fifth season.

Writing 
Slasher employs a season-long anthology format, with an overarching mystery storyline that will be resolved upon the season's conclusion. Series creator Aaron Martin was inspired by the format of American Horror Story, stating in 2016 that prospective subsequent seasons would retain the American Horror Story style of self-contained storylines; they would be used along with ideally as many actors from previous seasons as possible in new roles.

Martin has aimed to tell "a modern-day monster story" in Slasher, combining three of his favorite genres: the contemporary murder mystery (à la Broadchurch), the works of Agatha Christie, one of Martin's favorite crime writers, and the classic slasher films which he grew up with.  In terms of the latter, Martin has specifically cited the influences of Halloween and It Follows in Slashers use of a mysterious singular embodiment that is responsible for a series of killings.  Not wanting to have the show's killer be "a mythological creature" (as he feels the killers in most slasher films do not have much mystery surrounding them), Martin also uses elements of the traditional whodunit in Slasher: the characters, many of whom have mysterious backgrounds and their own reasons for possibly being the killer are featured, explored, and eliminated from consideration, one by one either through death or the natural deductive process, until the "all too human" killer and their motivations are revealed.

Filming 
Production on Slashers 8-episode first season was announced on July 28, 2015, with filming taking place between then and October 2015. Three Northern Ontario municipalities — the cities of Sudbury and Sault Ste. Marie and the town of Parry Sound — would stand in for the show's fictitious location, the town of Waterbury. Unlike most television series that film their episodes in order, under the direction of Craig David Wallace, the series was shot as if it were a "super-sized" movie. Scenes from multiple episodes were filmed simultaneously, with the availability of locations and cast being factored in. The out-of-order schedule allowed the actors to acknowledge their characters' fates, especially those who had to film their death scenes one day but return later to film earlier scenes if necessary. As an example, Martin cited Mark Ghanimé's first day on set, when his character, Justin Faysal, was laid out in a casket for a scene early in Slashers third episode. Justin's death, which took place in the second episode, would be filmed later on.

On May 1, 2017, Slasher began filming a second season in Orangeville, Ontario, Canada.

Release
A first trailer for the series premiered on November 26, 2015. On May 25, 2016, the entire first season of Slasher became available to stream instantly on Netflix US. On October 17, 2017, the full second season of Slasher became available to stream on Netflix in various countries. The series airs in the United Kingdom on Pick, where the first season premiered on May 10, 2016 and the second season on May 1, 2018. On May 23, 2019, the full third season of Slasher became available to stream in various countries on Netflix. In April 2020, Netflix removed all three seasons of Slasher with no explanation or prior warning. In late June 2020, all three seasons of Slasher were re-added to Netflix.

Reception

Critical response 
Slasher has received positive reviews. For the first season, the review aggregator website Rotten Tomatoes reported an 80% approval rating with an average rating of 5/10 based on 5 reviews. Zap2it called the series "a whole lot of fun" and "something for everyone," praising the series' anthology nature, its cast of characters, storyline, plot twists, bloody violence, and even the series-within-the-series Falcon Husbandry (shown as a favorite of Robin and Justin's in Episode 2). Bloody Disgusting awarded the show four skulls out of five, praising Katie McGrath as a great "protagonist and possible final girl" and the series' decision to feature an adult cast, rather than teenagers, with well-developed characters and a "decidedly classic" presentation. On the occasion of Slashers Super Channel premiere, The Globe and Mails John Doyle, while remarking that it "is no masterpiece of horror, nor was it meant to be," called the show "very well-crafted," praising its "exceptional cast" and tight pacing, and noting fans of gory horror will appreciate its bloody scenes.

Awards and nominations

References

External links
 
 

2016 American television series debuts
2010s American anthology television series
2010s American drama television series
2010s American horror television series
2010s American LGBT-related drama television series
2010s American mystery television series
2020s American anthology television series
2020s American drama television series
2020s American horror television series
2020s American LGBT-related drama television series
2020s American mystery television series
2016 Canadian television series debuts
2010s Canadian anthology television series
2010s Canadian drama television series
2010s Canadian LGBT-related drama television series
2020s Canadian drama television series
2020s Canadian LGBT-related drama television series
American thriller television series
Canadian thriller television series
Canadian horror fiction television series
Super Channel (Canadian TV channel) original programming
Shudder (streaming service) original programming
English-language Netflix original programming
Bisexuality-related television series
Horror drama television series
Northern Ontario in fiction
Racism in television
Serial killers in television
Serial drama television series
Television shows set in Ontario
Television series about neo-Nazism
Television shows filmed in Greater Sudbury
Gay-related television shows